Yushkovo is a rural locality (a village) in Vakhnevskoye Rural Settlement, Nikolsky District, Vologda Oblast, Russia. The population was 194 as of 2002.

Geography 
Yushkovo is located 36 km northwest of Nikolsk (the district's administrative centre) by road. Podgorye is the nearest rural locality.

References 

Rural localities in Nikolsky District, Vologda Oblast